The 1999 Scarborough Borough Council election to the  Scarborough Borough Council were held on 6 May 1999.  The whole council was up for election and the council stayed under no overall control.

Election result

|}

External links
1999 Scarborough election result

1999
1999 English local elections
1990s in North Yorkshire